Råstasjön is a lake next to the Friends Arena in Solna north of Stockholm, Sweden. On the lake, the 1912 final of the Swedish national bandy championship took place. A promenade of 2.1 km length leads around the lake. Råstasjön is connected to the lake Lötsjön by a small stream, which makes them twin lakes.

Fishing is not allowed.

External links

Lakes of Stockholm County

Swedish Bandy Final venues